Cullity is a surname. Notable people with the surname include:
Dave Cullity, American football player
Garrett Cullity, Australian philosopher
Kate Cullity, Australian landscape architect
Patrick Cullity (born 1987), American former professional ice hockey defenseman